Clock Dance (2018, Alfred A. Knopf) is the 22nd novel published by American author Anne Tyler.

Plot Summary
Eleven year old Willa Drake struggles to keep things together in the face of her mother's dramatic and disruptive behavior. As a young woman, she seeks stability in an early marriage, leaving college to build a steady and predictable environment for herself and her family. She must rebuild that life two decades later, after her husband's death. After another 20 years, at 61, Willa leads a comfortable, stylish life in Arizona with her semi-retired second husband, Peter. While she gets along fine in this environment, she finds it all confining and empty. Then one day, a stranger phones from Baltimore, seeking help for a young mother who has been seriously injured; the connection turns out to be that the woman is a former girlfriend of one of Willa's sons, the caller mistakenly assuming Willa is family. With few other commitments, Willa is drawn to fly east, husband in tow; they find Denise, her nine-year-old daughter Cheryl and a dog, Airplane, living in a small house in a rundown but lively Baltimore neighborhood. While she brings stability and support to Denise and Cheryl, Willa also reclaims her younger, freer and less deferential self.

References

Novels by Anne Tyler
2018 American novels